Congress/Wabash was a station on the Chicago Transit Authority's South Side Main Line, which is now part of the Green Line. The station was located at Congress Avenue and Wabash Avenue in the Loop neighborhood of Chicago. Congress/Wabash was situated south of Adams/Wabash and north of Roosevelt/Wabash. Congress/Wabash opened on October 18, 1897, to replace the Congress Terminal and closed on August 1, 1949.

References

Defunct Chicago "L" stations
Railway stations in the United States opened in 1897
Railway stations closed in 1949
1897 establishments in Illinois
1949 disestablishments in Illinois